Touba and the Meaning of Night is a novel written by the Iranian novelist, Shahrnush Parsipur and originally published in Iran in 1989. Written after the author had spent four years and seven months in prison, it is Parsipur's second novel and is a fictional account of a woman, Touba, living through the rapidly changing political environment of 20th century Iran. Like other works of Shahrnush Parsipur, Touba and the Meaning of Night is considered by most to be a feminist work. Also, like Parsipur's other work, Touba and the Meaning of Night remains banned in Iran.

Plot summary
Spanning eighty years, the novel follows the life of Touba, a young woman educated by her father in a time when few women received education. After her father passes away, Touba proposes to and marries a 52-year-old man. Initiated in desperation, the marriage causes Touba to fall into depression and eventually ends in a divorce. Touba later remarries a Prince of the Qajar dynasty. Though her second marriage starts happily, it also ends in divorce when the Prince takes a second wife. After the divorce, Touba is left to raise their daughter on the dwindling allowance afforded by her former husband's diminishing dynasty. To compensate, Touba weaves rugs.

References

Further reading

Iranian novels
Feminist novels
Censorship in Iran